Sven Rühr is a German bobsledder who competed in the late 1990s and the early 2000s. He won three medals in the four-man event at the FIBT World Championships with two golds (1996, 1997) and one silver (2000).

References

Bobsleigh four-man world championship medalists since 1930

German male bobsledders
Living people
Year of birth missing (living people)